Staphida is a genus of passerine birds in the white-eye family Zosteropidae.

Taxonomy
These species were formerly placed in the genus Yuhina. A molecular phylogenetic study published in 2019 found that Yuhina was not monophyletic. To create monophyletic genera these three species were moved to the resurrected genus Staphida that had originally been introduced in 1871 to accommodate the Indochinese yuhina by the English naturalist Robert Swinhoe in John Gould's The Birds of Asia.

The genus contains the following three species:
 Striated yuhina, Staphida castaniceps
 Indochinese yuhina, Staphida torqueola
 Chestnut-crested yuhina, Staphida everetti

References

 Del Hoyo, J.; Elliot, A. & Christie D. (editors). (2007). Handbook of the Birds of the World. Volume 12: Picathartes to Tits and Chickadees. Lynx Edicions. 

Bird genera
Staphida